The 2006 Indiana Hoosiers football team represented Indiana University Bloomington during the 2006 NCAA Division I FBS football season. The Hoosiers were coached by Terry Hoeppner, who was in his final season as head coach before he died of brain cancer in mid-2007. The Hoosiers played their home games at Memorial Stadium in Bloomington, Indiana.

Schedule

Roster

References

Indiana
Indiana Hoosiers football seasons
Indiana Hoosiers football